Schwoich is a municipality in the Kufstein district in the Austrian state of Tyrol located 5.50 km south of Kufstein at the southern side of the Inn River. The village has nine hamlets. Settlement of the area began in the 6th century but the community was mentioned for the first time as "Swiuch / Schweng" in 1280.

The area became famous because of a large deposit of blueberries. Other important sources of income are cement industry and tourism (particularly associated with sport activities).

References

External links
 Official website

Cities and towns in Kufstein District